HD 4113 b is a jovian planet located approximately 137 light-years away in the constellation of Sculptor, orbiting the star HD 4113. This planet has a very eccentric orbit with a 527-day period at 1.28 AU from the parent star. At periastron, the distance is 0.124 AU and at apastron, the distance is 2.44 AU.

See also
 HD 156846 b

References

External links
 
 

Sculptor (constellation)
Exoplanets discovered in 2007
Giant planets
Exoplanets detected by radial velocity

de:HD 4113 b